The Antelope Range is a mountain range in Nye County, Nevada. A small part of the range extends north into southern Eureka County.

The Monitor Range lies to the west across the Antelope Valley on the northwest and Little Fish Lake Valley on the southwest. Hot Creek Range adjoins the range to the south across Long Canyon. To the east lie the Park Range and Little Smokey Valley with the Fish Creek Range to the northeast.

Geology
The Middle Ordovician Whiterock Stage was named for geologic units in the region.

References 

Mountain ranges of Nevada
Mountain ranges of Nye County, Nevada
Mountain ranges of the Great Basin
Mountain ranges of Eureka County, Nevada